Malina (Czech/Slovak feminine: Malinová) is a surname. Notable people with the surname include:

 Andrzej Malina (born 1960), Polish wrestler
 Bruce Malina (1933–2017), American biblical scholar
 Frank Malina (1912–1981), American engineer and painter
 Jaroslav Malina (disambiguation), multiple individuals
 Joshua Malina (born 1966), American actor
 Judith Malina (1926–2015), American actor
 Libor Malina (born 1973), Czech discus thrower
 Ľubomír Malina (born 1991), Slovak ice hockey player
 Roger Malina (born 1950), American physicist and astronomer
 Tom Malina (born 1978), Czech windsurfer

See also
 

Czech-language surnames
Polish-language surnames
Slovak-language surnames